The 2020 Canterbury-Bankstown Bulldogs season was the 86th in the club's history. They were competing in the National Rugby League's 2020 Telstra Premiership. Dean Pay was the coach from Round 1 to Round 9. He formally resigned from this position on 14 July 2020 was replaced by Steve Georgallis, who was named as Pay's interim replacement. It was reported that, following Pay's resignation and Georgallis's appointment, the clubs other Assistant Coach, Steve Antonelli also resigned from his position. In Round 2 the NRL announced a shortened Season from 26 rounds to 20.

Fixtures

Regular season

 Matches from round 2 - 4 were played without crowds as part of the Australian Government's efforts to limit the spread of the COVID-19 virus.
Limited crowd attendance on matches from round 5 were allowed after the Australian government eased its COVID-19 restrictions.

Ladder

See also
 List of Canterbury-Bankstown Bulldogs seasons

References

Canterbury-Bankstown Bulldogs seasons
Canterbury-Bankstown Bulldogs season